Metaphilosophy is a peer-reviewed academic journal covering metaphilosophy. It is abstracted and indexed by PhilPapers and the Philosopher's Index.

Metaphilosophy was established in 1970 by Terry Bynum and Richard Reese. "Metaphilosophy" was given a working definition in the first issue of the journal as "the investigation of the nature of philosophy, with the central aim of arriving at a satisfactory explanation of the absence of uncontested philosophical claims and arguments." The journal is published by John Wiley & Sons and the editor-in-chief is Armen T. Marsoobian (Southern Connecticut State University).

References

External links 
 
 PhilPapers listing for Metaphilosophy

Metaphilosophy
Philosophy journals
Publications established in 1970